The 1994 Soul Train Music Awards were held on Tuesday, March 15, 1994, at the Shrine Auditorium in Los Angeles, California. The show was hosted by Patti LaBelle, Gladys Knight and Johnny Gill.

Special awards

Heritage Award for Career Achievement
 Barry White

Sammy Davis Jr. Award for Entertainer of the Year
 Whitney Houston

Winners and nominees
Winners are in bold text.

R&B Album of the Year – Male
 Babyface – For the Cool in You
 Tevin Campbell – I'm Ready
 Prince – The Hits/The B-Sides
 Luther Vandross – Never Let Me Go

R&B Album of the Year – Female
 Toni Braxton – Toni Braxton
 Mariah Carey – Music Box
 Janet Jackson – janet.
 Tina Turner – What's Love Got to Do with It

R&B Album of the Year – Group, Band or Duo
 Silk – Lose Control
 Earth, Wind & Fire – Millennium
 Intro – Intro
 Tony! Toni! Toné! – Sons of Soul

Best R&B Single – Male
 Tevin Campbell – "Can We Talk"
 Babyface – "Never Keeping Secrets"
 Dr. Dre – "Nuthin' but a 'G' Thang
 Luther Vandross – "Heaven Knows"

Best R&B Single – Female
 Toni Braxton – "Breathe Again"
 Oleta Adams – "I Just Had to Hear Your Voice"
 Whitney Houston – "I Have Nothing
 Janet Jackson – "That's the Way Love Goes"

Best R&B Single – Group, Band or Duo
 Jodeci – "Lately"
 H-Town – "Knockin' Da Boots
 Tony! Toni! Toné! – "Anniversary"

R&B/Soul Song of the Year
 Whitney Houston – "I Will Always Love You"
 Toni Braxton – "Breathe Again"
 Janet Jackson – "That's the Way Love Goes"
 Tony! Toni! Toné! – "Anniversary"

Best R&B Music Video
 Janet Jackson – "If"
 Arrested Development – "Mr. Wendal"
 Toni Braxton – "Breathe Again"
 Dr. Dre – "Nuthin' but a 'G' Thang"

Best R&B New Artist
 H-Town – "Knockin' Da Boots"
 Angie & Debbie – "Light of Love"
 Tag Team – "Whoomp! (There It Is)"
 Xscape – "Just Kickin' It"
 Vanessa Williams and Brian McKnight – "Love Is"

Best Rap Album
 Onyx – Bacdafucup
 Arrested Development – Unplugged
 Digable Planets – Reachin' (A New Refutation of Time and Space)
 Naughty by Nature – 19 Naughty III

Best Gospel Album
 Mississippi Mass Choir – It Remains to Be Seen
 Shirley Caesar – Stand Still
 Kirk Franklin & the Family – Kirk Franklin and the Family
 The Winans – All Out

Best Jazz Album
 Kenny G – Breathless
 George Benson – Love Remembers
 Terence Blanchard – The Malcolm X Jazz Suite
 Fourplay – Between the Sheets

Performers
 Whitney Houston – "Queen of the Night" / "I'm Every Woman"
 Onyx – "Slam"
 Digable Planets – "Rebirth of Slick (Cool Like Dat)"
 Babyface – "Never Keeping Secrets"
 Toni Braxton – "Another Sad Love Song"
 Johnny Gill – "Quiet Time to Play"
 Barry White Tribute:
 Johnny Gill – "It's Ecstasy When You Lay Down Next to Me"
 Patti LaBelle – "I've Got So Much to Give"
 Gladys Knight – "Can't Get Enough of Your Love, Babe"
 The Winans – "That Extra Mile"
 Snoop Doggy Dogg and Dr. Dre – "Nuthin' but a 'G' Thang" / "Who Am I? (What's My Name?)"  
 Bobby Brown and Whitney Houston – "Something in Common"

Presenters

Rosie Perez 
Naughty By Nature
T.K. Carter
Paul Rodriguez 
Tony! Toni! Toné!
Mary J. Blige
Karyn Parsons
Ralph Tresvant
Ricca
Lisa Lisa
Jamie Foxx
Silk
George Wallace
Jade
Kristoff St. John
Terry McMillan
Sheryl Lee Ralph
Xscape
Kirk Franklin
Earth, Wind and Fire
Bill Bellamy
Angie & Debbie
Jodeci
Oleta Adams
Magic Johnson
Tevin Campbell
Intro
T'Keyah Crystal Keymáh
Charles S. Dutton
Kenya Moore
Terrence Blanchard
Sinbad
Brian McKnight
Zhané
TLC
Don Franklin

Soul Train Music Awards
Soul
Soul
Soul
1994 in Los Angeles